Thomas Knaus (born September 28, 1974 in Frankfurt/Main) is a German educational scientist. He is a Professor of Educational Science specializing in Media Education and Head of Department of Media Pedagogy. at The Ludwigsburg University of Education and Honorary Professor for Educational Informatics at the Faculty of Computer Science & Engineering at the Frankfurt University of Applied Sciences (Frankfurt UAS). He also work as an Academic Director of the FTzM in Frankfurt am Main. He served as professor of Pedagogy at the University of Erlangen-Nuremberg as well as a visiting professor at the University of Otago (Dunedin, New Zealand), at the University of Sydney (Australia) and at the University of Vienna (Austria). Before his academic career Knaus worked as a teacher and a  media educator in extracurricular youth work in Frankfurt am Main and Bad Homburg.

Research and projects 
The primary focus of his research and work lies in the field of Media Education (digital literacy; digital change in educational institutions; media education in schools; methods and approaches in media research) and education informatics (educational technology, theory of technology, text and image in digital communication).

Knaus is the initiator and project manager of the cooperation projects fraLine (1999–2014) and fraMediale (since 2009). From 2011 to 2015 he was Managing Director of the Research Center Frankfurt Technology Center Media - FTzM, whose Scientific Director he is to this day. He is the initiator of the fraMediale Prize, publisher of the fraMediale book series in the  publishing house and project manager of the open access publication project "Forschungswerkstatt Medienpädagogik" ("Research Workshop Media Education")

Membership in scientific organizations 
Knaus is a member of the steering group of the initiative "No Education without Media!" (Keine Bildung ohne Medien – KBoM!) and as well member of the board of the Association for Media Education and Communication Culture (GMK); he ist member of the German Informatics Society (GI), the German Educational Research Association (GERA | DGfE), and the Professional Group School (GMK) as well as a spokesperson for the Qualitative Research Section (GMK). He is co-author of the interdisziplinary working group "Dagstuhl/Frankfurt triangle for Education in the digitally networked World" and one of the supporters of the "Digital Education Charter" of the German Informatics Society (GI).

Publications 
 Knaus, Thomas (2022): Making in media education: An activity-oriented approach to digital literacy, In: Journal of Media Literacy Education, 14(3), 53-65. https://digitalcommons.uri.edu/jmle/vol14/iss3/5/
 Knaus, Thomas; Junge, Thorsten; Merz, Olga (2022): Lehren aus der Lehre in Zeiten von Corona – Mediendidaktische Impulse für Schulen und Hochschulen, Munich: kopaed.
 Brinda, Torsten; Brüggen, Niels; Diethelm, Ira; Knaus, Thomas; Kommer, Sven; Kopf, Christine; Missomelius, Petra; Leschke, Rainer; Tilemann, Friederike; Weich, Andreas (2019): Frankfurt-Dreieck zur Bildung in der digital vernetzten Welt – Ein interdisziplinäres Modell
 Knaus, Thomas (2020): Technology criticism and data literacy. The case for an augmented understanding of media literacy, In: Journal of Media Literacy Education, 12(3), 6-16. https://digitalcommons.uri.edu/jmle/vol12/iss3/
 Knaus, Thomas (2020): Don’t resign, design! – Towards a Pedagogy of the Digital, In: Australian Educational Computing (ACCE: AEC), 35/1, p. 1–20. http://journal.acce.edu.au/index.php/AEC/article/view/217
 Knaus, Thomas; Schmidt, Jennifer (2020): Medienpädagogisches Making – ein Begründungsversuch, In: MedienImpulse – Beiträge zur Medienpädagogik (University Vienna), 58/4, p. 1–50. https://journals.univie.ac.at/index.php/mp/article/view/4322.
 Knaus, Thomas; Merz, Olga (2020): Schnittstellen und Interfaces – Digitaler Wandel in Bildungseinrichtungen (Vol. 7), Munich: kopaed.
 Knaus, Thomas; Meister, Dorothee M.; Narr, Kristin (2018): Futurelab Medienpädagogik. Professionalisierung – Qualitätsentwicklung – Standards, Munich: kopaed.
 Knaus, Thomas; Engel, Olga (2018): Spannung? Potentiale! – Digitaler Wandel in Bildungseinrichtungen (Vol. 6), Munich: kopaed.
 Knaus, Thomas; Engel, Olga (2016): Wi(e)derstände – Digitaler Wandel in Bildungseinrichtungen (Vol. 5), Munich: kopaed.
 Knaus, Thomas; Engel, Olga (2015): fraMediale – Digitale Medien in Bildungseinrichtungen (Vol. 4), Munich: kopaed.
 Knaus, Thomas; Döring, Nicola; Ludewig, Yvonne (2013): Die Wirksamkeit von Medienbildungsinitiativen: Erfolge, Probleme und Lösungsansätze, In: MedienPädagogik (Suisse).
 Knaus, Thomas; Bohnet, Nastasja (2019): Lernen mit Kopf, Herz und Handy – Zum Forschungsstand zu Emotionen (in) der Medienbildung, In: MedienImpulse – Beiträge zur Medienpädagogik (BMBWF, Vienna (Austria) 57/4, p. 1–41.
 Knaus, Thomas (2017/2018/2019): Media Pedagogy Research Workshop. Projects – Theories – Methods [Vol. 1|2|3], Munich: kopaed.
 Knaus, Thomas (2018): Me, my Tablet and I, In: Zeitschrift für Bildungsverwaltung (DGBV – Deutsche Gesellschaft für Bildungsverwaltung), 2/2018, pp. 15–35.
 Knaus, Thomas (2017): Understanding - Connecting - Responsibility. Why Media Education and Computer Science Education concern us all and why we should develop them together, in: Diethelm, Ira (Hrsg.): Informatische Bildung zum Verstehen und Gestalten der digitalen Welt, Bonn: Gesellschaft für Informatik (LNI – Lecture Notes in Informatics, P-274), S. 31–48.
 Knaus, Thomas (2017): The Potential of Digital Media – Theoretical Observations on the Educational and Teaching Potential of Tablet Computers, New Zealand Journal of Teachers’ Work, Vol. 14, Issue 1, pp. 40–49.
 Knaus, Thomas (2009): Kommunigrafie – Eine empirische Studie zur Bedeutung von Text und Bild in der digitalen Kommunikation, Munich: kopaed.

A full list of Knaus's publications can be found on the website of his department at the Ludwigsburg University of Education or on his website.

External links 
 
 
 publications
 Frankfurter Technologiezentrums profile
 profile at Department of Media Pedagogy at The Ludwigsburg University of Education
 profile at Department of Media Pedagogy at the University of Erlangen-Nuremberg
 profile at ResearchGate
 profile at ORCID

References 

1974 births
Living people
German philosophers
Philosophers of education
German computer scientists
Academic staff of the University of Erlangen-Nuremberg
Academic staff of the Ludwigsburg University of Education
Academic staff of the Frankfurt University of Applied Sciences
Goethe University Frankfurt alumni
Scientists from Frankfurt
21st-century German educators